Ian McMullen (born 17 November 1965) is an English footballer, who played as a midfielder in the Football League for Tranmere Rovers.

References

Tranmere Rovers F.C. players
Bangor City F.C. players
English Football League players
Association football midfielders
1965 births
Living people
English footballers